The 2019 Liberal Democrats leadership election was held following the announcement of the resignation of Vince Cable as leader on 24 May 2019, after just under two years as leader of the Liberal Democrats in the United Kingdom. The two candidates to succeed Cable were Ed Davey and Jo Swinson.

The result was announced on 22 July 2019 with Swinson winning with over 62% of the vote.

Background
Vince Cable had previously stated his intention to stand down before the next general election. Shortly before the party's 2019 Spring Conference, he announced that he would ask the party to hold the leadership election in May 2019, following the 2019 local elections. The party was expected to run a 9-week campaign starting after the European Parliament elections.

On 24 May, the day after the European elections (but before the results were counted on 26 May) and the same day that Prime Minister and leader of the Conservative Party Theresa May announced her upcoming resignation, the Liberal Democrat leadership election was formally started.

Election rules
The running of the leadership election was determined by Article 17 of the Liberal Democrat constitution. Liberal Democrat leadership elections use the alternative vote (instant runoff) system, with all party members being entitled to vote under a one member, one vote system. As of 8 June the party membership was 105,480.

Nominations closed on 7 June and the new leader was scheduled to take over on 23 July. Nominees were required to be an MP, have the backing of at least 10% of the Parliamentary party (i.e. one other MP), and be supported by at least 200 members spread across at least 20 different local parties.

Cable had put a proposal to the party's Spring Conference to change the rules to allow non-MPs to seek the leadership; however, this was rejected. Thus the pool of potential candidates were the 11 MPs in the party at the time of the close of nominations. A proposal to allow registered supporters, as well as members, to vote in the leadership contest was also rejected.

Party members registered before the close of nominations were able to vote via postal or electronic ballots; these were issued on 28 June and 1 July respectively. Voting closed on 22 July and the winner announced that evening.

Campaign 
In February 2019, eleven MPs from the Labour Party and Conservative Party resigned to form the centrist Independent Group, soon to be renamed as Change UK. Among potential leadership candidates, Jo Swinson was seen as most open to working with the Independent Group, while Ed Davey was least open.

Layla Moran, having been elected to parliament in 2017, was seen as the candidate least related to the Cameron–Clegg coalition government. Initially, most focus was on Swinson, Moran and Davey as likely contenders. However, in mid-May Moran announced that she would not be entering the contest. Following the May 2019 European Parliament elections, in which the Liberal Democrats performed extremely well, coming second and beating both the Conservative and Labour parties, Swinson and Davey were expected to be the candidates, with Swinson favoured by bookmakers. Swinson called on supporters of Change UK and the Greens to work with the Liberal Democrats, but stopped short of calling for a formal alliance between the parties. Stephen Bush, writing for the New Statesman, argued that the expected campaign issues—the legacy of the coalition and the threat of Change UK—were both largely rendered moot by the success of the Liberal Democrats in the local and European elections.

Davey launched his campaign on 30 May with a focus on revoking the UK's withdrawal from the European Union and on environmental issues by "de-carbonising capitalism". He hinted at more interest in encouraging defections to the Liberal Democrats than pacts with other parties, like Change UK. He also defended the record of the coalition. Swinson announced her campaign later that day too. Later that week, she said the party could be open to local electoral agreements to support other pro-Remain politicians, but that the Liberal Democrats were the "obvious rallying point" for those opposed to Brexit.

Liberal Democrat Chief Whip Alistair Carmichael announced that the MPs, while they may make individual endorsements like Christine Jardine, will stay largely neutral in the election and two MPs will nominate each candidate in order to show that MPs will work with whoever becomes leader. Christine Jardine and Tom Brake nominated Swinson, and Wera Hobhouse and Jamie Stone nominated Davey. Carmichael and Cable remained neutral in the campaign.

Candidates 
Roles in bold are currently held.

Declined 
The following MPs were discussed in the media as potential leadership candidates, but they declined to stand:

Tom Brake, MP for Carshalton and Wallington (1997–present); Party Spokesperson for Exiting the European Union (2017–present) and for the Office of First Secretary of State (2017–present) (endorsed Swinson)
Alistair Carmichael, MP for Orkney and Shetland (2001–present); Party Spokesperson for Environment, Food and Rural Affairs (2019–present), Chief Whip in the House of Commons (2017–present) and Deputy Leader of the Scottish Liberal Democrats (2012–present)
Christine Jardine, MP for Edinburgh West (2017–present) and Party Spokesperson for Work and Pensions (2019–present) (endorsed Swinson)
Norman Lamb, MP for North Norfolk (2001–present); Chair of the Science and Technology Select Committee (2017–present) and former Health Minister
Layla Moran, MP for Oxford West and Abingdon (2017–present) and Party Spokesperson for Education (2017–present)

Endorsements

Ed Davey

Jo Swinson

Public hustings
Ed Davey and Jo Swinson were invited to take place in a series of hustings organised by the party. Each of the fourteen events was held in a different location across Britain.

Opinion polling

Result

The electorate numbered 106,075, meaning that 76,429 Liberal Democrat members cast a vote, and 29,646 did not.

See also
2019 Conservative Party leadership election
2019 UK Independence Party leadership election

Notes

References

External links
 Ed Davey campaign website
 Jo Swinson campaign website

Liberal Democrats leadership election
2019
Liberal Democrats leadership election
Jo Swinson
Liberal Democrats leadership election